PCEP may refer to:

Places
 Plymouth-Canton Educational Park

Transit
 Peninsula Corridor Electrification Project, the plan to electrify the Caltrain right-of-way between San Francisco and San Jose

Computing
 Path Computation Element Communications Protocol, a computer network routing protocol